The brothers Eugene Haag (11 February 1808 – 5 March 1868) and Émile Haag (18 November 1810 – 11 May 1865) were two French Protestant historians and theologians, known collectively as the Frères Haag or the Haag Brothers.

They were born in Montbéliard. Both died in Paris, Eugene at the age of 60 and Émile at the age of 54.

Sources

1808 births
1810 births
1865 deaths
1868 deaths
Sibling duos
Historians of Protestantism
French theologians
19th-century French historians
Writers from Montbéliard
Polish–French translators
German–French translators
English–French translators
19th-century translators